is a Japanese professional baseball player. He played for the Fukuoka SoftBank Hawks and Chunichi Dragons for the Nippon Professional Baseball(NPB).

On December 2, 2019, he became a free agent.

References

External links

 NPB.com

1988 births
Living people
Chunichi Dragons players
Fukuoka SoftBank Hawks players
Japanese baseball players
Nippon Professional Baseball infielders
Baseball people from Okayama Prefecture